WDJM-FM (91.3 FM) is a radio station broadcasting a variety format. Licensed to Framingham, Massachusetts, United States. The station is currently owned by Framingham State University.

The station was constructed in 1970 and began broadcasting that same year. Originally called WFSB-FM, the station received new calls on January 21, 1974, after a donation from Post-Newsweek Stations, which asked for the calls to replace those of WTIC-TV in Hartford, Connecticut, to honor the president of their television station group as WFSB (Channel 3). The new calls for WDJM, in turn, honored the then-president of Framingham State College, D. Justin McCarthy. In 1984, the station was granted a power increase to 100 watts and has been operating at this power ever since. The station is currently located on the 4th floor of the D. Justin McCarthy College Center. Sid Schweiger, IT manager of WRKO as well as WDJM's engineer has been working at WDJM for over 30 years.

WDJM offers a wide variety of student-run programming. DJs are granted two-hour time slots in which they can play an open format of music. Show formats range from classic rock, metal, electronic, dance, religious, reggae, hip-hop, sports, and more. When a show is not on the air, WDJM broadcasts programming from the Talking Information Center. Over the years, WDJM has hosted many events and activities on campus, ranging from dances to trivia nights to game nights and more.

Beginning in the Fall 2011 semester, WDJM began to stream its broadcasts on the internet. The station's website is also undergoing major reconstruction.

References

External links

DJM-FM
Framingham State University
Framingham, Massachusetts
Mass media in Middlesex County, Massachusetts
Radio stations established in 1970
1970 establishments in Massachusetts